Hybosida is a genus of East African palp-footed spiders that was first described by Eugène Louis Simon in 1898.

Species
 it contains four species, found only in Africa:
Hybosida dauban Platnick, 1979 – Seychelles
Hybosida lesserti Berland, 1920 – East Africa
Hybosida lucida Simon, 1898 (type) – Seychelles
Hybosida scabra Simon & Fage, 1922 – East Africa

See also
 List of Palpimanidae species

References

Araneomorphae genera
Palpimanidae
Spiders of Africa